The Clark House is a historic building located in Iowa City, Iowa, United States.  This property was originally part of Plum Grove, the estate of Iowa's first Territorial Governor, Robert Lucas.  This lot was eventually sold to Florence A. Clark in 1870. She was a granddaughter of Governor Lucas, and her husband, Augustus L. Clark, was a direct descendant of a signer of the Declaration of Independence, Abraham Clark.  Built in 1874, the house is a transitional style from the simplicity of Plum Grove to the richness of the Victorian.  The 2½-story brick Italianate has an L-shaped main block and a 1½-story wing off the back.  The main block is capped with a hip roof with gable ends and bracketed eaves.  It also has a wrap-around porch.  The house was listed on the National Register of Historic Places in 1996.

References

Houses completed in 1874
Italianate architecture in Iowa
Houses in Iowa City, Iowa
National Register of Historic Places in Iowa City, Iowa
Houses on the National Register of Historic Places in Iowa